Ivy Day is an annual ceremony in which an ivy stone is placed on either a residential, academic or administrative building or ground to commemorate academic excellence. The ceremony is most known for being practiced among older colleges in the Northeastern United States. It is most associated with the Ivy League and a group of small liberal arts college known as the Little Ivies. Some institutions announce members of Phi Beta Kappa and specialized honor designations for students. Some classes donate to the college, in the form of gates, facades, and door outlines, by inscribing or creating their own version of symbolic icons of the college's seal or other prominent insignia. The ivy stones are usually decorated with the graduation date and a symbol that represents the college as a whole or the class as a whole. The most common ivy stone is one-by-two feet and is usually made out of workable stone.

On occasion students have featured prominent alumni on their class on ivy stones or have selected to feature an engraving of a member of their graduating class. Since 1873 at the University of Pennsylvania and since 1879 at Bates College, students have unveiled class ivy stones at the annual ivy day preceding commencement. Students may also have a selective procession prior to the official commencement walk to honor each stone being placed on the buildings. On some occasions students plant ivy in front or on the side of their ivy stones. Princeton University also places class ivy stones on the walls of its buildings, a few days prior to their commencement. Students are known to give speeches at Ivy Day to commemorate their time and work at the college. Select medical schools also participate in Ivy Day prior to their White Coat Ceremony.

As part of the modern college admissions process, the term "Ivy Day" also refers to the day in late March where the Ivy League universities release their admissions decisions.

References

External links 

 Image of University of Southern California students marching on Ivy Day, Los Angeles, 1926. Los Angeles Times Photographic Archive (Collection 1429). UCLA Library Special Collections, Charles E. Young Research Library, University of California, Los Angeles.

Traditions
Ceremonies in the United States
Bates College